The 1905–06 MIT Engineers men's ice hockey season was the 7th season of play for the program.

Season
Hopes were high after MIT produced a winning season in 1905 but from the start the '06 team had trouble. Two games to be played in New York City were announced for the Christmas break but as it turned out the matches were never arranged. The college newspaper laid the blame at the feet of team manager Benjamin Sharpe who responded with a defense that no such announcement had been made. The paper stood by its statement and used reports from three Boston-area papers as corroboration. 

Note: Massachusetts Institute of Technology athletics were referred to as 'Engineers' or 'Techmen' during the first two decades of the 20th century. By 1920 all sports programs had adopted the Engineer moniker.

Roster

Standings

Schedule and Results

|-
!colspan=12 style=";" | Regular Season

References

MIT Engineers men's ice hockey seasons
MIT
MIT
MIT
MIT
MIT